Andrea Kolbeinsdóttir (born 8 February 1999) is an Icelandic middle-distance and long-distance runner. In 2019, she won the bronze medal in the women's 5000 metres event at the 2019 Games of the Small States of Europe held Budva, Montenegro.

In 2018, she competed in the women's half marathon at the 2018 IAAF World Half Marathon Championships held in Valencia, Spain. She finished in 99th place. 
In 2020, she competed in the women's half marathon at the 2020 World Athletics Half Marathon Championships held in Gdynia, Poland.

References

External links 
 

Living people
1999 births
Place of birth missing (living people)
Icelandic female middle-distance runners
Icelandic female long-distance runners